Vasari is an Italian surname. Notable people with the surname include:

Gaetano Vasari (born 1970), Italian footballer
Giorgio Vasari (1511-1574), Italian painter
Lazzaro Vasari (1399-1468), Italian painter

See also
Thomas Vásári (died after 1381), Hungarian nobleman in the 14th century

Italian-language surnames